Shakhawan Abdulla is an Iraqi politician from the Kurdistan Democratic Party. He represents Kirkuk Governorate in the Council of Representatives of Iraq. In January 2022 he was elected deputy speaker.

References 

Living people
Year of birth missing (living people)
Members of the Council of Representatives of Iraq
Kurdistan Democratic Party politicians
Legislative deputy speakers
People from Kirkuk Governorate